Allium tanguticum is a Chinese species of wild onion native to Gansu, Qinghai and Tibet. It grows at elevations of about 2000–3500 m.

Allium tanguticum produces one round to egg-shaped bulb up to 15 mm across. Scape is up to 50 cm tall, round in cross-section. Leaves are flat, shorter than the scape, up to 4 mm wide. Umbel is hemispheric, with many purple flowers crowded together.

References

tanguticum
Onions
Endemic flora of China
Plants described in 1887